State Route 219 (SR 219) is a  state highway that runs south-to-north through portions of Muscogee, Harris, Troup, and Heard counties in the west-central part of the U.S. state of Georgia. It runs from Columbus north to a point southwest of Franklin.

Route description
SR 219 begins at an intersection with US 27/SR 1 (Veterans Parkway) in Columbus in Muscogee County. It heads north-northwest to SR 85 (Manchester Expressway). Then, it curves to the northwest to an intersection with US 80/SR 22 (J.R. Allen Parkway). The highway heads through the rural northwestern part of the county and enters Harris County. A short distance after entering Harris County is an intersection with SR 315 in Piney Grove. SR 219 then heads northeast to begin paralleling Interstate 185 (I-185) for a while. During that stretch is an intersection with SR 103 and SR 116. After leaving I-185, SR 219 heads north to an intersection with SR 18 on the Harris–Troup county line. In Troup County, the highway heads through rural areas to its interchange with I-85 (Pearl Harbor Memorial Highway). It heads north, and enters LaGrange, where it meets US 27/SR 1. Here, US 29 joins the concurrency. One block later, SR 219 turns left onto SR 14 (Greenville Street), while US 27/US 29/SR 1/SR 14 continue to the north on N. Morgan Street. At Main Street, Greenville Street changes to Broad Street. SR 14/SR 219 continues to the west until they reach N. Greenwood Street, where SR 219 departs to the north, while SR 14 continues to the west on Broad Street. The highway departs LaGrange to the northwest, crosses over two sections of West Point Lake, and enters Heard County. In Heard County, SR 219 continues to the northwest. It passes through rural areas, and curves to the north. It then meets its northern terminus, an intersection with SR 34, southwest of Franklin.

SR 219 is not part of the National Highway System, a system of roadways important to the nation's economy, defense, and mobility.

Major intersections

See also

References

External links

 Georgia Roads (Routes 201 - 220)
 Georgia State Route 219 on State-Ends.com

219
Transportation in Muscogee County, Georgia
Transportation in Harris County, Georgia
Transportation in Troup County, Georgia
Transportation in Heard County, Georgia